The 2004–05 2. Bundesliga was the 31st season of the 2. Bundesliga, the second tier of the German football league system. 1. FC Köln, MSV Duisburg and Eintracht Frankfurt were promoted to the Bundesliga while Eintracht Trier, Rot-Weiß Oberhausen, Rot-Weiss Essen and Rot-Weiß Erfurt were relegated to the Regionalliga.

League table
For the 2004–05 season Rot-Weiß Erfurt, 1. FC Saarbrücken, Rot-Weiss Essen and Dynamo Dresden were newly promoted to the 2. Bundesliga from the Regionalliga while Eintracht Frankfurt, TSV 1860 Munich and 1. FC Köln had been relegated to the league from the Bundesliga.

Results

Top scorers
The league's top scorers:

References

External links
 Official Bundesliga site  
 2. Bundesliga @ DFB 
 kicker.de 

2. Bundesliga seasons
2004–05 in German football leagues
Germany